Lourdes Secondary School, established in 1956, is a school in the south-west of Glasgow which serves a large catchment area, including the communities of Cardonald, Craigton, Crookston, Drumoyne, Govan, Hillington, Ibrox, Kinning Park, Mosspark, Penilee and Pollok. It has an enrolment of approximately 1,200 pupils and 90 members of staff.

Grounds
The building was designed around a quadrangle, housing collections of shrubbery. Until recently, this area featured a large flowerbed imitation of the school crest that was designed and planted by pupils as part of the celebrations for the new millennium.

It consists of one large main building, which was originally designed by Thomas Smith Cordiner and constructed in the 1950s and with an extension added in the 1970s. The school has over fifty teaching classrooms, with dedicated areas for science, technical, and music/drama. Two astroturf pitches, three gymnasiums, a games hall and a large internal garden area also make up the school grounds. The school underwent extensive refurbishment in 2002, in line with the City Council's Project 2002 programmer of school refurbishments.

Notable former pupils

 Mhairi Black, politician, the youngest ever Member of Parliament (MP) elected to the House of Commons of the United Kingdom since at least the Reform Act of 1832, replacing William Wentworth-Fitzwilliam
 Harry Conroy (1943–2010), General Secretary of the National Union of Journalists from 1985 to 1990.
 Siriki Dembélé, footballer
 Dean Keenan, footballer
 Tommy Sheridan, politician

References

External links
Lourdes Secondary School's page on Scottish Schools Online
Lourdes Secondary School at Gazetteer for Scotland

Catholic secondary schools in Glasgow
Educational institutions established in 1956
Govan
Buildings and structures completed in 1956
1956 establishments in Scotland